Secret Lives is a 1932 comedy novel by the British writer E. F. Benson, best known as the author of the Mapp and Lucia series. The structure is broadly similar to that series, featuring two strong-willed women battling for social supremacy in the fictitious Durham Square in Edwardian London.

Margaret Mantrip is the queen bee of a garden square in London, reigning over the various inhabitants. When Susan Leg, a mysterious new resident arrives, it threatens to upset her carefully-ordered world. Little known to her is the fact that the newcomer is secretly the author of a series of trashy but bestselling novels under the pen name Rudolph Da Vinci.

References

Bibliography
 Masters, Brian. The Life of E.F. Benson. Chatto & Windus, 1991.
 Palmer, Geoffrey & Lloyd, Noel. E.F. Benson - As He Was. Lennard, 1988.
 Reilly, John M. Twentieth Century Crime & Mystery Writers. Springer, 2015.

1932 British novels
British comedy novels
Novels set in London
Novels by E. F. Benson
Hodder & Stoughton books
Novels set in the 1900s
Novels about writers